Zolimomab aritox is a mouse monoclonal antibody which has been investigated for the treatment of systemic lupus erythematosus and graft-versus-host disease, but the studies failed to show positive effects of the drug.

It is an anti-CD5 antibody which is linked to the A chain of the ricin protein (which is reflected by the aritox in the drug's name).

See also 
 Telimomab aritox

References 

Monoclonal antibodies